Vileyka Voblast was a territorial entity in the Belarusian Soviet Socialist Republic created on 4 December 1939 out of the eastern powiats of the Wilno Voivodeship after the annexation of West Belarus (then part of the Kresy Zachodnie region in Poland) into the BSSR on 14 November 1939. The administrative centre of the province was the city of Vileyka. 

Initially the oblast consisted of Vileyka, Ashmyany, Braslav, Dzisna, Postavy and Sventiany raions. In January 1940, it consisted of 22 raions: Ostrovets, Oshmyany, Braslav, Vidzy, Gadutsishki, Glubokoye, Dzisna, Dokshitsi, Dunilovichi, Ilya, Krivichi, Kurenets, Molodechno, Miory, Miadzieł, Postavy, Wagtails (its centre was Plisa), Radashkovichy, Smorgon, Sventiany, Svir and Dergachi (its centre was Sharkovshchina). In November 1940, the raions of Gadutsishki and Sventiany as well as parts of the Ostrovets, Oshmyany, Postavy and Svir raions were transferred to the Lithuanian SSR. Also, during the German occupation between 1941 and 1944, Oshmyany raion was part of Wilna Land General Bezirk at Litauen and the city of Vileyka Glubokoye was part of General Bezirk Weissruthenien in Reichskommissariat Ostland. 

On September 20, 1944, the oblast was renamed to Maladzyechna Voblast and the administrative centre was relocated to Maladzyechna. On the same day, the raions of Braslav, Vidzy, Glubokoye, Dzisna, Dokshitsi, Dunilovichi, Miory, Plisa, and Sharkovshchina and the Kuropolye village of Postavy raion were transferred to Polatsk Voblast and Iwye, Volozhin and Yuratishki raions of Baranavichy Voblast were transferred to Maladzyechna. Vileyka, the former voblast centre, was part of Kurenets raion and became a raion centre after the Kurenets raion's centre was relocated to it and the raion was renamed Vileyka on 5 July 1946.

External links
Administrative division of Belarus: a historical information 

Former subdivisions of Belarus
Soviet occupation of Eastern Poland 1939–1941